Jérôme Guisset (born 29 October 1978) is a French former professional rugby league footballer.

Playing career
He started his career with AS Saint Estève, then as a 16-year-old  with the Canberra Raiders in the National Rugby League, where he played five times for the first grade, before bulking up and moving up to the front row. He was part of the 1997 and 1998 French senior championship winning St Estève sides.

In 1999 Guisset played a season with Australian National Rugby League club, the Canberra Raiders.

He spent six seasons with Warrington, making 124 appearances, but he left at the end of 2004 when he was not offered a new deal. He spent some time in 2005 playing rugby union for CA Brive, and toured with the France Sevens squad in New Zealand and the United States.

At the start of the 2005 season, Wigan were suffering from a  crisis after a career-ending injury to newly signed Luke Davico. Chairman Maurice Lindsay moved to fill the gap by bringing Guisset to Wigan on a two-year contract. Jerome made 25 appearances for Wigan in 2005 and was one of the most consistent performers in an injury-ravaged season.

Midway through 2005, Guisset had agreed a deal with new Super League outfit Catalans Dragons and, in September, the club confirmed that he would be released from the second year of his contract.

He has been named in the France training squad for the 2008 Rugby League World Cup.

He had been named in the France squad for the 2008 Rugby League World Cup.

References

External links
Super League profile
Rugby League Project stats
Jerome Guisset (image)
Profile on itsrugby.co.uk
Warrington's World Cup heroes – Jérôme Guisset

1978 births
Living people
AS Saint Estève players
CA Brive players
Canberra Raiders players
Catalans Dragons players
France international rugby sevens players
France national rugby league team captains
France national rugby league team players
French people of Spanish descent
French rugby league coaches
French rugby league players
French rugby union players
Rugby league props
Rugby league second-rows
Sportspeople from Perpignan
Warrington Wolves players
Wigan Warriors players